Red Nights (Les Nuits rouges du Bourreau de Jade) is a 2010 French-Hong Kong film by Julien Carbon and Laurent Courtiaud. It is a thriller and a tale of erotic horror. The filmmakers call it a Hong Kong giallo with mystery, (sadistic) murders, fetishism and women. The film played at the 2010 Toronto International Film Festival in the Midnight Madness section.

Plot
There is a legend of an executioner who created a poison which brought death through absolute pleasure. This legend repeats nowadays when a French woman flees to Hong Kong after killing her lover and stealing from him an old artifact containing this poison. She meets a mobster from Taiwan and an epicurean and sadistic woman killer, who all want to get the precious poison.

Cast

References

External links
 
 

2009 films
2000s French-language films
2000s Cantonese-language films
French multilingual films
Hong Kong multilingual films
Hong Kong LGBT-related films
French LGBT-related films
Films shot in Hong Kong
Lesbian-related films
2000s erotic thriller films
Hong Kong martial arts films
Girls with guns films
2009 martial arts films
2009 horror films
Hong Kong thriller films
Hong Kong horror films
French thriller films
French horror films
BDSM in films
2000s French films
2000s Hong Kong films
2009 multilingual films